Visual information fidelity (VIF) is a full reference image quality assessment index based on natural scene statistics and the notion of image information extracted by the human visual system.  It was developed by Hamid R Sheikh and Alan Bovik at the Laboratory for Image and Video Engineering (LIVE) at the University of Texas at Austin in 2006. It is deployed in the core of the Netflix VMAF video quality monitoring system, which controls the picture quality of all encoded videos streamed by Netflix.

Model overview 
Images and videos of the three-dimensional visual environments come from a common class: the class of natural scenes. Natural scenes from a tiny subspace in the space of all possible signals, and researchers have developed sophisticated models to characterize these statistics. Most real-world distortion processes disturb these statistics and make the image or video signals unnatural. The VIF index employs natural scene statistical (NSS) models in conjunction with a distortion (channel) model to quantify the information shared between the test and the reference images. Further, the VIF index is based on the hypothesis that this shared information is an aspect of fidelity that relates well with visual quality. In contrast to prior approaches based on human visual system (HVS) error-sensitivity and measurement of structure, this statistical approach used in an information-theoretic setting, yields a full reference (FR) quality assessment (QA) method that does not rely on any HVS or viewing geometry parameter, nor any constants requiring optimization, and yet is competitive with state of the art QA methods.

Specifically, the reference image is modeled as being the output of a stochastic `natural' source that passes through the HVS channel and is processed later by the brain. The information content of the reference image is quantified as being the mutual information between the input and output of the HVS channel. This is the information that the brain could ideally extract from the output of the HVS. The same measure is then quantified in the presence of an image distortion channel that distorts the output of the natural source before it passes through the HVS channel, thereby measuring the information that the brain could ideally extract from the test image. This is shown pictorially in Figure 1. The two information measures are then combined to form a visual information fidelity measure that relates visual quality to relative image information.

System model

Source model 
A Gaussian scale mixture (GSM) is used to statistically model the wavelet coefficients of a steerable pyramid decomposition of an image. The model is described below for a given subband of the multi-scale multi-orientation decomposition and can be extended to other subbands similarly. Let the wavelet coefficients in a given subband be  where  denotes the set of spatial indices across the subband and each  is an  dimensional vector. According to the GSM model, 

Distortion model 
The distortion process is modeled using a combination of signal attenuation and additive noise in the wavelet domain.

 

HVS model 
The duality of HVS models and NSS implies that several aspects of the HVS have already been accounted for in the source model. Here, the HVS is additionally modeled based on the hypothesis that the uncertainty in the perception of visual signals limits the amount of information that can be extracted from the source and distorted image. This source of uncertainty can be modeled as visual noise in the HVS model. In particular, the HVS noise in a given subband of the wavelet decomposition is modeled as additive white Gaussian noise. Further, let  and  denote the visual signal at the output of the HVS.

VIF index 

Let  denote the vector of all blocks from a given subband. Let  and   be similarly defined. The amount of information extracted from the reference is obtained as

 

while the amount of information extracted from the test image is given as

 

Performance 
The Spearman's rank-order correlation coefficient (SROCC) between the VIF index scores of distorted images on the LIVE Image Quality Assessment Database and the corresponding human opinion scores is evaluated to be 0.96.

References

External links
 Laboratory for Image and Video Engineering at the University of Texas
 An implementation of the VIF index
 LIVE Image Quality Assessment Database

University of Texas System
Film and video technology
Image processing